Ana Maria Teles Carreira is the ambassador of Angola to the United Kingdom. She has a law degree, an MA in diplomatic studies from the Diplomatic Academy of London at the University of Westminster, and is a career diplomat in the Angolan Foreign Service. Among the positions she has held in the Ministry of External Relations are Director of Legal and Consula Affaires and Director for Asia and Oceania. She served in Congo Brazzaville as a counsellor and was ambassador to India and nonresident Ambassador to Thailand. She was accredited to the Court of St. James's in November 2005. She is also non-resident Ambassador to Ireland.

References

Angolan women ambassadors
Living people
Year of birth missing (living people)
Angolan women diplomats
Ambassadors of Angola to India
Ambassadors of Angola to Thailand
Ambassadors of Angola to Ireland
Ambassadors of Angola to the United Kingdom